The Netherlands was represented by duo Sandra and Andres, with the song "Als het om de liefde gaat", at the 1972 Eurovision Song Contest, which took place on 25 March in Edinburgh. Sandra and Andres, an established act with five previous top 10 hits to their name, were internally selected by broadcaster NOS to be the Dutch representatives and the song was chosen at the national final on 22 February. Sandra (full name Sandra Reemer would appear twice more at Eurovision in 1976 and 1979).

Before Eurovision

Nationaal Songfestival 1972 
The final was held on 22 February 1972 at the Theater Carré in Amsterdam, hosted by Willy Dobbe. Only three songs were performed and voting was by eleven regional juries with 10 points each to divide between the songs. "Als het om de liefde gaat" emerged the clear winner.

At Eurovision 
On the night of the final Sandra and Andres performed last in the running order, following eventual contest winners Luxembourg. The pair, both dressed in outfits in vivid shades of green, gave a confident and engaging performance of the night's most bouncy, uptempo song and at the close of voting "Als het om de liefde gaat" had received 106 points, placing the Netherlands 4th of the 18 entries.

The Dutch conductor at the contest was Harry van Hoof.

"Als het om de liefde gaat" reached number 3 on the Dutch Singles chart and was also released in English, French and German versions.

Voting

References

External links 
 Dutch Preselection 1972

1972
Countries in the Eurovision Song Contest 1972
Eurovision